The Order of Merit of Brandenburg is a civil order of merit, and the highest award of the German State of Brandenburg.  The award is presented by the Minister-President of Brandenburg.

Notable recipients
Rolf-Dieter Amend
Kathrin Boron
Günter de Bruyn
Jürgen Eschert
Hermann von Richthofen
Wolfgang Kohlhaase
Manfred Kurzer
Jutta Lau
Henry Maske
Siegfried Matthus
Werner Otto
Hasso Plattner
Matthias Platzeck
Michael Succow
Adele Stolte
Heinz Durr
Hannah Pick-Goslar

References

Brandenburg
Brandenburg
Culture of Brandenburg